Leonid Arkadyevich Yakubovich PAR (born 31 July 1945) is a Russian actor and television host, best known for hosting the game show Pole Chudes (the Russian version of the Wheel of Fortune – literally, The Field of Wonders – and the celebrity episode of Slaboye Zveno). Yakubovich is one of the best-known television and internet personalities in Russia. In January 2023, Ukraine imposed economic sanctions on Leonid Yakubovich for his support of 2022 Russian invasion of Ukraine.

Biography 
Yakubovich was born in Moscow into a Soviet Jewish family. His father was born in Belarus. In his youth, Yakubovich sought a practical profession, and studied metal craftsmanship. After finishing his education, he went to work at ZIL as a heat-gas technician. In college, Yakubovich started performing in the Russian KVN show.

In the 1980s he became a freelance satire writer and actor, and even played in the Russian children's "film-magazine" Yeralash. Even so, Yakubovich was not considered experienced enough for regular work in television until in 1991 he accepted Vladislav Listyev's proposal to host Pole Chudes. Listyev was previously a mentor to Yakubovich, and helped sharpen his acting skills, among others.

References

External links 

 Сайт «Поля чудес»

1945 births
Living people
Male actors from Moscow
Soviet male actors
Russian male actors
Russian game show hosts
Jewish Russian comedians
Soviet television presenters
Russian television presenters
People's Artists of Russia
Honored Artists of the Russian Federation
Russian male television actors
Russian Jews
Russian people of Belarusian-Jewish descent
Russian people of Belarusian descent
Russian people of Jewish descent
Jewish Russian actors